Statistics of Scottish Football League in season 1973–74.

Scottish League Division One

Scottish League Division Two

See also
1973–74 in Scottish football

References

 
Scottish Football League seasons